Roberto Delgado & Orquesta, is a Panamanian salsa orchestra based in Panama City. The band leader is Roberto Delgado. The band has released five studio albums and since the release of the album La Rosa de los Vientos (1996) by singer-songwriter Rubén Blades, the ensemble became his backing band for most of his projects. Following albums included Son de Panamá (2015), which was awarded the Latin Grammy Award for Best Salsa Album and the Grammy Award for Best Tropical Latin Album, and Salsa Big Band (2017), which was awarded the Latin Grammy Award for Best Salsa Album and Album of the Year, and the Grammy Award for Best Tropical Latin Album.

Band members

Discography
Rubén Blades presenta a Roberto Delgado (1996)
Roberto Delgado & Orquesta (2004)
Roberto Delgado y su Orquesta... En Vivo (2008)
Son de Panamá (2015)
Salsa Big Band (2017)
SALSWING! (2021)
SALSA PLUS! (2021)
SWING! (2021)

Awards and nominations

Grammy Awards
The Grammy Awards are awarded annually by the National Academy of Recording Arts and Sciences in the United States. The orchestra has received two awards.

|-
|rowspan="1" scope="row"| 2016
|scope="row"| Son de Panamá
|rowspan="3"| Best Tropical Latin Album
| 
|-
|rowspan="1" scope="row"| 2018
|scope="row"| Salsa Big Band
| 
|-
|rowspan="1" scope="row"| 2021
|scope="row"| SALSWING!
| 
|-

Latin Grammy Awards
The Latin Grammy Awards are awarded annually by the Latin Academy of Recording Arts & Sciences in the United States. The orchestra has received five awards from six nominations.

|-
|rowspan="2" scope="row"| 2015
|rowspan="2" scope="row"| Son de Panamá
|scope="row"| Album of the Year
| 
|-
|scope="row"| Best Salsa Album
| 
|-
|rowspan="2" scope="row"| 2017
|rowspan="2" scope="row"| Salsa Big Band
|scope="row"| Album of the Year
| 
|-
|scope="row"| Best Salsa Album
| 
|-
|rowspan="2" scope="row"| 2021
|rowspan="1" scope="row"| SALSWING!
|scope="row"| Album of the Year
| 
|-
|rowspan="1" scope="row"| SALSA PLUS!
|scope="row"| Best Salsa Album
| 
|-

References

Panamanian musical groups
Salsa music groups
Latin Grammy Award winners
Grammy Award winners
Musical groups established in 1996